Sahidul Alam (born 1 May 1992), popularly known as Shahidul Alam Sohel, is a Bangladeshi professional footballer who plays as a goalkeeper for Bangladesh Premier League club Abahani Limited Dhaka and the Bangladesh national team.

Personal life
Shahidul Alam Sohel was born on 9 January 1989 in Chittagong, Bangladesh and spent his childhood there. Besides playing football, he also serves in the Bangladesh Navy.

Career statistics

International

Honours

Club
Abahani Limited Dhaka  
 Bangladesh Premier League (2) : 2016, 2017–18
 Federation Cup (4) : 2016, 2017, 2018, 2021–22
 Independence Cup (1) : 2021–22

References

External links
 
 

Living people
1992 births
Bangladeshi footballers
Bangladesh international footballers
Sheikh Jamal Dhanmondi Club players
People from Chittagong
Association football goalkeepers
Footballers at the 2014 Asian Games
Asian Games competitors for Bangladesh
Bangladesh Football Premier League players